Carl Joseph Barbier (born August 21, 1944) is a Senior United States district judge of the United States District Court for the Eastern District of Louisiana.

Education and career

Born in 1944 in New Orleans, Louisiana, Barbier attended West Jefferson High School before receiving a Bachelor of Arts degree from Southeastern Louisiana University in 1966 and a Juris Doctor from Loyola University New Orleans School of Law in 1970. He was a law clerk to Judge William Redman, Louisiana Court of Appeal, Fourth Circuit from 1969 to 1970, and to Judge Fred Cassibry of the  United States District Court for the Eastern District of Louisiana from 1970 to 1971. Barbier was in private practice in New Orleans from 1971 to 1998.

Federal judicial service

On May 19, 1998, Barbier was nominated by President Bill Clinton to a seat on the United States District Court for the Eastern District of Louisiana vacated by Okla Jones. Barbier was confirmed by the United States Senate on September 28, 1998, and received his commission on October 1, 1998. Barbier assumed senior status January 1, 2023.

Notable cases

In August 2010, he was appointed to hear the cases in the Deepwater Horizon oil spill. It is expected that at least 300 cases will be consolidated in his court.

On November 14, 2011, Barbier ruled that BP, the company that leased the Deepwater Horizon oil rig, must face federal maritime lawsuits by Alabama and Louisiana. On September 4, 2014, he further found BP to be grossly negligent in the spill, attributing 67% of the blame to the company. As a result, the company may be liable for as much as $18 billion in fines under the Clean Water Act.

References

External links

1944 births
Living people
Judges of the United States District Court for the Eastern District of Louisiana
United States district court judges appointed by Bill Clinton
Lawyers from New Orleans
Southeastern Louisiana University alumni
Loyola University New Orleans College of Law alumni
20th-century American judges
21st-century American judges